Axcil Ramar Jefferies (born 14 April 1994) is a Zimbabwean professional racing driver and senior race instructor at Yas Marina Circuit in Abu Dhabi. He currently holds the Nürburgring Nordschleife lap record in the GT3-class with a time of 7:50.370 which he set in a Konrad Motorsport Lamborghini Huracán GT3.

Career

Karting
Jefferies started his motorsport career aged six in Zimbabwe and went on to win several national championships in Zimbabwe and South Africa before moving to Europe. In 2007 and 2008 he won races in the European Karting Championship.

Formula BMW
Jefferies contested the Formula BMW Pacific series in 2009 and 2010. He finished third overall in the 2009 season, taking pole position at Sepang and Okayama, and winning two races at Sepang and a total of 12 podiums. He completed a limited schedule in 2010, with two wins and four podiums.

FIA Formula Two Championship
In 2012, after not racing for two years, Jefferies returned to action in FIA Formula Two halfway through the season with a best of 5th in wet conditions at Circuit de Spa-Francorchamps in Belgium. He finished twelfth in the championship standings.

Indy Lights and GP2
In 2013 Jefferies made his debut in the American Firestone Indy Lights series with Bryan Herta Autosport at the Mid-Ohio Sports Car Course and finished seventh. He competed again two months later at the Houston race and finished fifth. In 2014 Jefferies competed in the Indy Lights Indy 200 at Mid-Ohio finishing sixth in the first race and fourth in the second race.

In 2014 Jefferies made his GP2 debut at the Bahrain International Circuit. In race one he was hit by Kimiya Sato and forced to retire. In the second race he made up several positions after starting from the back.

Lamborghini Super Trofeo
In 2017 Jefferies competed in the Lamborghini Super Trofeo Middle East. Jefferies dominated the first round at the Yas Marina Circuit by being fastest in all practice sessions, taking pole position and winning the race. Round 2 was held at Dubai Autodrome, where again Jefferies was on pole in the Pro Class and won both races. Round 5 and 6 saw Jefferies on pole again in dominant fashion and winning both races to clinch the overall championship.

Jefferies continued his top form in his debut in the Lamborghini Super Trofeo Europe by setting the fastest time in official practice for the first round at Monza Circuit. He then qualified third overall on Saturday and won the first race and finishedsecond in the second race. He left Monza leading the championship. Jefferies continued his good form with two third place finishes at Circuit Paul Ricard, a third place at the Silverstone Circuit, another win and a third place at Spa Francorchamps and a third place at the Nürburgring. Another 2 podiums in Imola saw Jefferies finish as runner-up in the championship. He then finished second in the World Finals.

In 2018 Jefferies defended his Middle East Championship, this time running with Konrad Motorsport. He scored with 5 podiums, including 3 wins.

GT racing
24H Series

Jefferies competed in his first 24-hour long race at the Circuit Paul Ricard in France during the weekend of 6 and 7 May 2017 with the GP Extreme team as part of the 24H Series. He qualified the Renault R.S. 01 GT3 in fourth place overall. After a hard-fought battle Jefferies and his team finished fourth overall. In August 2017 Jefferies completed his second 24-hour long race at the Algarve International Circuit, again with GP Extreme in the Renault R.S. 01. The team qualified second and were sitting in the top 3 for the first twelve hours before a mechanical fault dropped them to an eventual eighth place finish overall. 

Axcil Jefferies competed in the 2019 Dubai 24 Hour. He raced for GPX Racing in the Renault R.S. 01 in the Pro-Am category, qualifying 6th overall and taking the start for the team. The transmission failed on lap 8 and unfortunately no replacement gearbox was available for the team so the car was retired. In November 2019 Axcil competed in the 24-hour race in at Circuit of the Americas with Toksport WRT in the Mercedes AMG GT3. The team qualified in second position and battled for the lead for 22 hours with the Black Falcon Mercedes AMG GT3 until a mechanical fault caused the team to lose 5 laps and finish fith overall.

January 2020 kicked off on a high with Axcil Jefferies taking the wheel of the Toksport WRT Mercedes AMG GT3 for the Dubai 24 hour race. He qualified in eighth position. Taking the start of the race, Axcil made up 5 positions on track before handing the car over to Martin Konrad in P3. The car finsihed the race as second in the Pro-Am class.

In January 2021 Axcil Jefferies won the Dubai 24 Hour with GPX Racing. Axcil shared the #36 Porsche 911 GT3-R with Mathieu Jaminet, Julien Andlauer, Frédéric Fatien and Alain Ferté.

In January 2022 Axcil Jefferies repeated his 2021 win by again winning in the Dubai 24 Hour. This time he competed with MS7 by WRT in an Audi R8 LMS alongside Dries Vanthoor, Christopher Mies, Thomas Neubauer and Mohammed Saud Fahad Al Saud. The team completed a total of 596 laps beating the sister car to second place by a single lap. It was a dominant performance by team WRT after winning Pole Position and leading for more than 500 laps. Axcil Jefferies became only the third driver to win the race consecutively. 

Nürburgring Endurance Series

Axcil Jefferies competed in the 2019 VLN Series. He took several podiums and top 10 qualifying positions in his first season in the series based at the Nürburgring Nordschleife. Konrad Motorsport also fielded Axcil in the 24 Hours of Nürburgring race alongside Marco Mapelli, Michele Di Martino and Michael Lyons.

In 2020 he completed his second full season in the Nürburgring Endurance Series with Konrad Motorsport. The team finished the season with 3 podiums. Jefferies also qualified the car in sixth overall at the 24 Hours of Nürburgring

In 2021 he competed in the Nürburgring Endurance Series for a third year. He achieved several front row starts in the NLS and finished the season with 2 podiums.

In the first round of the 2022 Nürburgring Endurance Series Jefferies took the Nürburgring Endurance Series lap record in the GT3-class, driving in the Lamborghini Huracán GT3 Evo of Konrad Motorsport.

GT World Challenge Europe Sprint

In 2020 Axcil made his debut in the GT World Challenge Europe Sprint Cup in the Silver category with Ezequiel Pérez Companc's Madpanda Motorsport. He finished second in the Silver Cup.

FIA World Endurance Championship

In 2023, Jefferies landed a seat with Northwest AMR's GTE Am class entry alongside Paul Dalla Lana and Nicki Thiim. Jefferies essentially won the seat at the WEC Prologue, where he and Thomas Merrill competed for the final seat in the entry.

Prototypes
In 2021 Axcil debuted in an LMP3-class Ligier JS P320 with Frikadelli Racing.

Personal life
In 2014 Jefferies was appointed as a UN AIDS Ambassador for the United Nations Aids Campaign. In 2017 Axcil was drafted into the Lamborghini Young Driver Program.

Racing record

Career Summary

Complete GP2 Series results
(key) (Races in bold indicate pole position) (Races in italics indicate fastest lap)

Complete GT World Challenge Europe Sprint Cup results
(key) (Races in bold indicate pole position) (Races in italics indicate fastest lap)

Complete FIA World Endurance Championship results
(key) (Races in bold indicate pole position) (Races in italics indicate fastest lap)

References

External links
 

1994 births
Living people
Sportspeople from Slough
English people of Zimbabwean descent
Zimbabwean racing drivers
Formula BMW Pacific drivers
FIA Formula Two Championship drivers
Indy Lights drivers
GP2 Series drivers
24H Series drivers
International GT Open drivers
Asian Le Mans Series drivers
FIA World Endurance Championship drivers
Nürburgring 24 Hours drivers
Trident Racing drivers
Belardi Auto Racing drivers
Bryan Herta Autosport drivers
Motaworld Racing drivers
Eurasia Motorsport drivers
Mercedes-AMG Motorsport drivers
W Racing Team drivers
Le Mans Cup drivers
Toksport WRT drivers
WeatherTech SportsCar Championship drivers
Aston Martin Racing drivers